Camille Wauters (13 November 1856 – 10 September 1919) was a Belgian painter.

Life and work
Camille Wauters was born in Temse, East Flanders, Belgium, on 13 November 1856. He was a landscape painter. Wauters was taught by Ferdinand de Braekeleer the Elder. He studied at the Académie Julian in Paris, where he improved his technique. His talent and studies would have allowed him to reach greater fame, but Wauters avoided exhibitions, wholly living for his art.

He died in Lokeren on 10 September 1919.

Gallery

Further reading
 Wauters, Camille, Oxford Art Online
 Loft, Dacca, Camille Wauters, Temse, 1856 - Lokeren, 1919: schilder van Nijl en Schelde, 2000
 Bénézit, Emmanuel, Dictionnaire critique et documentaire des peintres, sculpteurs, dessinateurs et graveurs de tous les temps et de tous pays par un groupe d'écrivains spécialistes français et étrangers,  Paris: Librairie Grund, 1966
 Eemans, M., Moderne kunst in België,  Hasselt: Heideland-Orbis, 1975
 Flippo, Willem G., Lexicon of the Belgian romantic painters, Antwerpen: International art press, 1981
 Berko, Patrick; Berko, Viviane, Dictionary of Belgian painters born between 1750 & 1875, Brussel: Laconti, 1981
 Piron, Paul, De Belgische beeldende kunstenaars uit de 19de en 20ste eeuw vol. 2, Brussel: Art in Belgium, 1999, p. 1567

References

External links

1856 births
1919 deaths
People from Temse
People from Lokeren
19th-century Belgian painters
19th-century Belgian male artists
20th-century Belgian painters
20th-century Belgian male artists